Paul Israel (born 23 April 1969) is an Australian former rugby league footballer who played for the South Sydney Rabbitohs in the New South Wales Rugby League competition in Australia, his position of choice was as a Lock-forward.

Background
Israel was born in Sydney, New South Wales, Australia.

Career playing statistics

Point scoring summary

Matches played

References

Australian rugby league players
Living people
1969 births
South Sydney Rabbitohs players
Rugby league locks
Rugby league players from Sydney